Richard William Wheaton III (born July 29, 1972) is an American actor. He portrayed Wesley Crusher on the television series Star Trek: The Next Generation, Gordie Lachance in the film Stand by Me, Joey Trotta in Toy Soldiers, and Bennett Hoenicker in Flubber. Wheaton has also appeared in recurring voice acting roles as Aqualad in Teen Titans, Cosmic Boy on the Legion of Super Heroes, and Mike Morningstar/Darkstar in the Ben 10 franchise's original continuity. He appeared regularly as a fictionalized version of himself on the sitcom The Big Bang Theory and in the roles of Fawkes on The Guild, Colin Mason on Leverage, and Dr. Isaac Parrish on Eureka. Wheaton was the host and co-creator of the YouTube board game show TableTop. He has narrated numerous audio books, including Ready Player One and Ready Player Two.

Early life
Wheaton was born July 29, 1972, in Burbank, California, to Debra "Debbie" Nordean (née O'Connor), an actress, and Richard William Wheaton Jr., a medical specialist. He has a brother, Jeremy, and a sister, Amy, both of whom appeared uncredited in the Star Trek: The Next Generation episode "When the Bough Breaks". Amy appeared alongside Wil in the 1987 film The Curse.

As an adult, Wheaton described his father as being abusive to him as a child and his mother as being an enabler of that abuse. He also stated that his parents forced him to become an actor.  He is currently estranged from his parents.

Career

Early work and Stand By Me
Wheaton made his acting debut in the television film A Long Way Home (1981), which starred Timothy Hutton. He voiced the character of Martin in the animated film The Secret of NIMH (1982), the film adaptation of Robert C. O'Brien's book Mrs. Frisby and the Rats of NIMH (1971). Wheaton also appeared in Hambone and Hillie (1983), The Buddy System (1984) (opposite Richard Dreyfuss and Susan Sarandon), and the Last Starfighter.

Wheaton first gained widespread attention for his work in Stand by Me (1986), the film adaptation of Stephen King's novella The Body. In Stand by Me, Wheaton played the lead role of Gordie Lachance, a 12-year-old storyteller mourning the loss of his elder brother. In her review of the film, Sheila Benson of the Los Angeles Times wrote that "Wheaton makes Gordie's 'sensitivity' tangible, but not effete. He's a gem". In addition to being successful at the box office, Stand by Me was nominated for the Golden Globe Award for Best Motion Picture – Drama and became known as a coming-of-age classic.

Star Trek

Wheaton played Wesley Crusher, a "boy genius and Starfleet hopeful", during the first four seasons of Star Trek: The Next Generation. He appeared in an additional four episodes of the remaining three seasons. The Wesley Crusher character is a "polarizing" character; while some Star Trek fans love him, others are vocal about their hatred for the character. Wheaton commented about his critics in a 2004 interview for WebTalk Radio:

Wheaton left Star Trek: The Next Generation due to concerns over how the production team addressed a scheduling conflict related to his wish to appear in the 1989 film, Valmont.

Wheaton returned to Star Trek in 2002 and 2022, reprising his Wesley Crusher role in cameo appearances in Star Trek: Nemesis, and in the season 2 finale of Star Trek: Picard.

Post-Star Trek

Wheaton played Joey Trotta in the action film Toy Soldiers (1991). After leaving Star Trek, he moved to Topeka, Kansas, to work for NewTek, where he helped to develop the Video Toaster 4000 doing product testing and quality control and later used his public profile to serve as a technology evangelist for the product.

Afterward, he returned to Los Angeles, attended acting school for five years, and then re-entered the acting world. In the late 1990s and early 2000s, Wheaton appeared in several independent films, including the award-winning The Good Things (2001), in which he portrays a frustrated Kansas tollbooth worker. For his performance in Jane White Is Sick & Twisted (2002) he received the award for Best Actor at the Melbourne Underground Film Festival.

Voice work
Wheaton has worked as a voice actor in animation, video games and audiobooks, beginning with the role of Martin Brisby in The Secret of NIMH at age 10. His most noteworthy credits include the roles of Aqualad in the cartoons Teen Titans and Teen Titans Go!, the voice of radio journalist Richard Burns in Grand Theft Auto: San Andreas, Kyle in the Nickelodeon cartoon, Kyle + Rosemary as well as himself and various other characters on both Family Guy and Seth MacFarlane's Cavalcade of Cartoon Comedy. Wheaton also featured as the second Blue Beetle, Ted Kord, on Batman: The Brave and the Bold, Dr. Peter Meechum in Generator Rex, Mike Morningstar / Darkstar in Ben 10: Alien Force, Ben 10: Ultimate Alien & Ben 10: Omniverse. Wheaton took upon the anime roles of Yakumo in Kurokami: The Animation, Menma in Naruto, Hans in Slayers Evolution-R, Aaron Terzieff in Mobile Suit Gundam Unicorn. In August, 2021. Wheaton voiced the villainous John Juniper in the video game, I Expect You To Die 2: The Spy and the Liar.

He appeared as himself in a skit on nerdcore rapper MC Frontalot's 2008 album Final Boss attempting to be a rapper, whose rhymes only involved shellfish.  Wheaton later collaborated with Frontalot on "Your Friend Wil", a track from the 2010 album Zero Day on the subject of what Wheaton calls "Wheaton's law": "don't be a dick".

Wheaton has narrated a number of bestselling audiobooks, mostly in the science-fiction and fantasy category, including Ready Player One by Ernest Cline (Wheaton also exists in the novel's universe, described as being joint President along with Cory Doctorow, of the OASIS User Council in the virtual world, which is the setting for much of the book) and its sequel Ready Player Two, Armada, also by Cline,  Redshirts by John Scalzi, Fuzzy Nation by Scalzi, and books 6–10 of the Chronicles of Amber series by Roger Zelazny.

Television and web

Wheaton was a contestant on a 2001 episode of The Weakest Link featuring Star Trek actors attempting to win money for charity. He has made guest appearances on the November 23, 2007, episode of the TV series Numb3rs, and the October 22, 2008, episode of the series Criminal Minds, and appeared in Internet presentations, including a cameo in a comedy sketch ("Lock Out") for LoadingReadyRun (and a reprise of the same the following year, in CommodoreHustle 4), and the May 30, 2008, episode of the Internet series Gorgeous Tiny Chicken Machine Show. From 2009 to 2011, Wheaton appeared in seasons 3, 4, and 5 of the web series The Guild as Fawkes, the leader for a rival guild known as Axis of Anarchy. Wheaton credits his roles in Gorgeous Tiny Chicken Machine Show and The Guild for reigniting his career by encouraging him to seek out roles as the "Villain You Love To Hate" stock character. He also appears in seasons 2, 3, and 4 of the television series Leverage, as rival computer hacker Colin "Chaos" Mason, antagonist to Leverage team hacker Alec Hardison. He made regular appearances in many web productions for Geek & Sundry, including hosting TableTop, a board game based show, and Titansgrave, a roleplaying game based show.

He appeared as a fictionalized version of himself in 17 episodes of the sitcom The Big Bang Theory, starting in season 3, episode 5: "The Creepy Candy Coating Corollary" (2009). On the show, Wheaton behaves in comically petty and manipulative ways towards main character Sheldon Cooper, who regards him as an archenemy until the season 5 episode "The Russian Rocket Reaction", when they make amends and become friends. Wheaton appears in 12 episodes in a recurring, guest-starring role on Eureka, playing Dr. Isaac Parrish, the head of the Non-Lethal Weapons Lab at Global Dynamics and a thorn in Fargo's side. Wheaton also voices the character of the former scoutmaster and current sous-chef Earl Harlan in the popular dark, surreal-comedy podcast Welcome to Night Vale.

Wheaton played Alexander Rook in the Syfy TV series Dark Matter, based on the eponymous comic book.

Hosting
From September 2006 to September 2007, Wheaton hosted a Revision3 syndicated video podcast called InDigital along with Jessica Corbin and Hahn Choi. He hosted a NASA video on the Mars Curiosity rover which landed on Monday August 6, 2012. He has hosted "2nd Watch", interviews with cast members and producers of the science-fiction series Falling Skies that appears online after each episode.  On April 3, 2014, Wheaton announced on his blog that his new show called The Wil Wheaton Project would premiere on the SyFy network at 10pm on May 27 for an initial projected run of twelve episodes. However, on August 29, Wheaton blogged that SyFy canceled the show after only one season. Wheaton has hosted Star Trek aftershow The Ready Room since the second season in 2020.

Other ventures

Games

In 2003, Wheaton mentioned his love for the game of poker on his blog. The following year, he began writing more extensively about his poker-playing experiences, including stories about playing Texas hold 'em tournaments locally and in Las Vegas. Eventually, he worked up to regular play, including a run at the 2005 World Poker Tour Championships. On June 23, 2005, Wheaton accepted an invitation to join Team PokerStars. He went on to play in that year's World Series of Poker and was the guest speaker for the 2005 BARGE Banquet. In June 2007, he announced he would no longer be on Team Pokerstars due to changes in the US legal system that would cause poker sites to have to focus on European and Asian markets and held a farewell Pokerstars tournament on June 5, 2007, which he titled So Long and Thanks for All the Chips.

Wheaton is a Dungeons & Dragons player, and played during the PAX 2010 event using the 4th edition rules. Wheaton, along with webcartoonists Jerry Holkins and Mike Krahulik of Penny Arcade, and Scott Kurtz of PvP, played in front of a live audience. The game was hosted and recorded by Wizards of the Coast with Chris Perkins as the dungeonmaster. Wheaton also played D&D 4th edition at the PAX 2011 event using the 4th edition rules, and used the D&D Next play test rules at PAX Prime 2012.

Wheaton hosts the web series TableTop that he created with Felicia Day, in which he explains how to play various card, board, and dice games, then plays the game with celebrity guests. This web series has had over 4.5 million views and raised $1.4 million on Indiegogo for its third series, a record amount for a web series at that time In 2018 it appears in syndication on the TBD cable television.

Wheaton starred in the Kickstarter-funded game There Came an Echo by Iridium Studios. In Dungeons and Dragons Online, he became the dungeon master of the Temple of Elemental Evil quests.

Nintendo of America announced on Twitter that Wheaton would be voicing Abraham Lincoln in Code Name: STEAM. Wheaton announced in February 2015 that he was chosen to provide voiceover talent for the strategy role-playing video game Firefly Online, a game based on Joss Whedon's Firefly sci-fi franchise. Wheaton does the voice narration on the Secret Hitler companion app for the Secret Hitler social deduction game.

Wheaton has spoken out against misogyny in video game culture, and wrote a profile of Anita Sarkeesian for the 2015 Time 100.

Comic book
A fictionalized version of Wheaton was included in the comic book PS 238, in which he harbors the power of telekinesis. Wheaton's debut comic book The Guild: Fawkes, which he wrote alongside Felicia Day, was released on May 23, 2012.

Audiobooks
Wheaton has recorded several of his non-self-published books as downloadable audiobooks. These include Just A Geek, Dancing Barefoot, The Happiest Days of Our Lives, Dead Trees Give No Shelter, asteraleS, kamaKiri and The Criminal Minds Production Diary, an excerpt from his book Sunken Treasure.

Narrations

Wheaton provided the voice-over for the digital gamebook Trial of the Clone.

Live shows
Wheaton has performed improvisational and sketch comedy at the ACME Comedy Theater in Hollywood.  He has a traveling sketch comedy/improv troupe called "EarnestBorg9" that performs science fiction-related comedy at conventions.

Writing
Wheaton runs his own blog, Wil Wheaton Dot Net. Between 2001 and late 2004, he operated a message board, known as "The Soapbox" or "Paracosm", as part of the blog site. Two collections of writings taken from postings to the message board have been published, titled Boxer Shorts and Boxer Shorts Redux. He contributes regularly to the Los Angeles-based Metroblogging site. In June 2005, he became that month's featured Tech writer for the SuicideGirls Newswire.

In early 2003, he founded the independent publishing company Monolith Press and released a memoir entitled Dancing Barefoot. Monolith Press was "founded on the idea that publication should not be limited by opportunity." Most of the entries are extended versions of his blog entries. Dancing Barefoot sold out three printings in four months. In winter 2003, Wheaton signed to publisher Tim O'Reilly with a three-book contract. O'Reilly acquired Dancing Barefoot, and published his extended memoirs, Just a Geek, in summer of 2004. He has since written about his bitterness regarding how the book was marketed, believing it was pitched as a Star Trek book when he intended it as more of a personal memoir. Subsequently, in 2007, his next book, The Happiest Days of Our Lives was again published by Monolith Press. In 2008, Subterranean Press published a special expanded edition. 

With the release of Sunken Treasure: Wil Wheaton's Hot Cocoa Box Sampler in February 2009, instead of using traditional publishing, Wheaton decided to self-publish using Lulu Publishing, releasing paperback and digital copies, something he has continued to do with all his publications since. As a chapbook, Sunken Treasure contains several small extracts of various different projects, including two short stories from Ficlets, an ACME comedy sketch, William's Tell and a Criminal Minds production diary. The production diary was later released as an audiobook. Later that same year, Wheaton released Memories of the Future: Volume 1, a humorous critique, as well as an account of Wheaton's own experiences with, and memories of, the first thirteen episodes of Star Trek: The Next Generation. Closing up 2009, Wheaton published a special edition of The Happiest Days of Our Lives, which included an afterword by his son, Ryan. The Happiest Days of Our Lives and Sunken Treasure were released on a Creative Commons license.

In 2017, Wheaton wrote the short story "Laina" for the Star Wars anthology From a Certain Point of View. The book features 40 short stories, each by a different author, to commemorate the 40th anniversary of Star Wars.

In 2022, Wheaton published Still Just a Geek, an annotated memoir that includes extensive (and often constructively self-critical) author's commentary on Just a Geek, as well as previously unpublished work.

Politics
Wheaton described himself as a liberal in 2005. In a column that he wrote for Salon.com in 2005, The Real War on Christmas, Wheaton attacked conservative commentators like Bill O'Reilly, Rush Limbaugh and Sean Hannity for influencing the political views of his parents, with whom Wheaton found himself unable to have political discussions during family get-togethers on holidays like Christmas. His parents were very offended by the article, and he posted a lengthy apology on his site and an interview in which his parents clarified their political views.

Wheaton campaigned for Hillary Clinton in the 2016 general election.

Immediately following the Sutherland Springs church shooting on November 5, 2017, Wheaton on Twitter stated in response to Congressman Paul Ryan's call for prayers for the victims that "The murdered victims were in a church. If prayers did anything, they'd still be alive, you worthless sack of shit." Wheaton subsequently clarified his opinion after receiving criticism, writing "I apologize to those of you who are sincere people of Faith, who felt attacked by me", but accused "the right wing noise machine" of using his comments "to deflect attention and anger away from the role that unfettered access to weapons of mass murder played in the latest incidence of mass murder in America".

He has also been vocal about criticizing other entertainers he disagrees with, such as Dave Chappelle, after his "The Closer" special, and PewDiePie, after a Facebook algorithm recommended a PewDiePie fan group to Wil Wheaton.

Personal life
Wheaton married Anne Prince on November 7, 1999, and lives in Arcadia, California, with her and her two sons from a previous relationship. Upon reaching maturity, both sons asked Wheaton to legally adopt them, which he did.

Wheaton was roommates with Chris Hardwick while they were both students at UCLA. They met at a showing of Arachnophobia in Burbank, California.

In January 2021, Wheaton announced he had been sober from alcohol for five years.

Wheaton lives with complex post-traumatic stress disorder generalized anxiety disorder, and chronic depression. He supports mental health nonprofit organizations in raising awareness for these conditions.

In 2022, Wheaton participated in Celebrity Jeopardy!, playing for the National Women's Law Center. He reached the finals, defeating Troian Bellisario and Hasan Minhaj in the quarterfinals, and John Michael Higgins and Joel Kim Booster in the semifinals.

Honors
Young Artist Awards: 1989 & 1987
Melbourne Underground Film Festival: Best Actor (2002)
International Academy of Web Television Awards: Best Host (Pre-Recorded) (2014)

An asteroid was named after him: 391257 Wilwheaton.

Filmography

Films and television films

TV shows and appearances

Web shows and series

Animation

Video games

Bibliography

 Dancing Barefoot (2004)
 Just a Geek (2004)
 Stories of Strength (2005; contributor)
 The Happiest Days of Our Lives (2007)
 Sunken Treasure (2009)
 Memories of the Future Vol. 1 (2009)
 Wil Wheaton's Criminal Minds Production Diary (2009)
 Clash of the Geeks (2010; contributor)
 The Day After, and Other Stories (2010)
 The Monster in My Closet (2011)
 Hunter (2011)
 Dead Trees Give No Shelter (2017)
 Star Wars: From a Certain Point of View (2017; contributor) 
 Still Just a Geek (2022)

References

Further reading
 Holmstrom, John. The Moving Picture Boy: An International Encyclopaedia from 1895 to 1995. Norwich, Michael Russell, 1996, p. 390-391.
 Wheaton, Wil. "My name is Wil Wheaton. I Live With Chronic Depression and Generalized Anxiety. I Am Not Ashamed." Medium.com, June 1, 2018.

External links

 
 Wil Wheaton talks about his depression and anxiety 
 WWdN: In Exile
 
 
 
 
 

1972 births
20th-century American male actors
21st-century American male actors
21st-century American memoirists
American atheists
American bloggers
American male bloggers
American male child actors
American male film actors
American male television actors
American male voice actors
American male web series actors
American poker players
Creative Commons-licensed authors
Living people
Male actors from Burbank, California
People from Arcadia, California
People with mood disorders
University of California, Los Angeles alumni
Web series producers